Huawei AppGallery (abbreviated AppGallery onscreen) is a package manager and application distribution platform, or marketplace 'app store', developed by Huawei Technologies Co., Ltd. for the Google-developed open-source Android operating system, Huawei's HarmonyOS and Microsoft's Windows 11.  AppGallery is used by 420 million active users on 700 million Huawei devices.

Huawei AppGallery, launched  in China, and  worldwide, is pre-installed with all new Huawei mobile devices.  When Huawei's new devices lost access to Google Mobile Services (GMS) and other Google applications due to the China–United States trade war in May 2019, the company could not use Google services on some of its new phones, especially the Mate 30, and began to release its phones using only AppGallery, and its own proprietary Huawei Mobile Services (HMS) without GMS, Google Play store, and all other Google apps installed on them.

Huawei launched HarmonyOS on August 9, 2019, first on smart TVs for Honor Vision and Vision S smart TV brands which came with AppGallery pre-installed with native HarmonyOS apps and compatible Android apps. In 2019, 45,000 Android apps using HMS Core on AppGallery.

During third quarter of 2020, AppGallery has reached 350 billion app downloads.  In 2020, AppGallery had 490 million users in over 170 countries and regions, nearly 1.6 million developers., more than 96,000 apps and over 50,000 HMS enabled  apps

On March 1, 2021, AppGallery has over 530 million active users, and an 83% yearly increase in-app distribution.

Huawei launched HarmonyOS 2.0 on smartphones and tablets on June 2, 2021, with AppGallery pre-installed with HarmonyOS apps and compatible Android apps. Since, most of the apps available in the AppGallery was Android .apk based which crowded the new infertile HarmonyOS apps ecosystem. On, June 10, 2021, a week after HarmonyOS 2.0 launch install base of over 10 million users, Huawei launched a HarmonyOS Apps and Games section on its AppGallery to differentiate from Android apps with the small imprinted "HMOS" badge on the right hand corner of the icon to make the apps more discoverable in the ecosystem for users. This would allow developers to add an HM OS logo on the bottom side of the app icon to identify as the HarmonyOS app. To enter the HarmonyOS section, users need to search “Hongmeng” in the search bar of AppGallery, which makes HarmonyOS app search and downloading easier.
	
Huawei's already has 134,000 HMS enabled apps on AppGallery and over 4 million developers have signed on during the Huawei Apps Up 2021 event.

As of July 27, 2022, during the HarmonyOS 3 event, Huawei revealed that the HMS ecosystem is growing together with its 5.4 million global developers. AppGallery has established itself as one of the world’s top 3 app markets, with over 203,000 apps integrated with HMS.

See also
EMUI
HarmonyOS
List of Android app stores
List of mobile app distribution platforms

References

External links

AppGallery Connect — official Huawei mobile app services portal, at Huawei Developer

2011 introductions
Android (operating system)
AppGallery
Mobile software distribution platforms